Modo Island may refer to

Modo, Jindo County, South Korea
Modo, Ongjin County, South Korea